Christian Henrik Glass (18 May 1821 - 12 August 1893) was a Danish composer, organist and pianist.  He was a student of Johann Peter Emilius Hartmann.  His son was the composer and pianist Louis Glass.

Male composers
Danish classical pianists
Danish classical organists
Male classical organists
1821 births
1893 deaths
19th-century Danish composers
19th-century classical pianists
Male classical pianists
19th-century male musicians
19th-century organists